Victoria Rowland (née Sykes; born 4 December 1969), known both professionally and socially as Plum Sykes, is an English-born fashion journalist, novelist, and socialite.

Early years and antecedents 
Victoria Sykes was born in London, one of six children including a twin sister, Lucy, and grew up in Sevenoaks, Kent. She was nicknamed 'Plum' (the Victoria plum being a variety of that fruit) as a child. Sykes has described herself as a "painfully shy" child with mousey brown hair and goofy teeth. Among her friends at Ide Hill Church of England Primary School was Rowan Pelling, who became the editor (or "editrice") of the Erotic Review. From there she went to a private secondary school, Walthamstow Hall, where she was unhappy, and subsequently to Sevenoaks School, an independent boys' school that had begun admitting girls to the sixth form. In 1988 she went up to Worcester College, Oxford, where she graduated in modern history. She has published a short memoir of her unsettling first term at university (Oxford Girl, 2011).

Sykes' mother Valerie Goad, a dress designer, separated from Sykes' father Mark while Plum was at Oxford. The effects of this left her impecunious for a while and she received assistance from Worcester to remain at the college. Sykes' grandfather, Christopher Sykes (1907–1986), whom she knew as "Fat Grandpa" or "F.G.", was a friend and official biographer (1975) of the novelist Evelyn Waugh and son of the diplomat Sir Mark Sykes, sixth baronet (1879–1919), associated with the so-called Sykes–Picot Agreement of 1916, by which Britain and France provided for the partition of the Ottoman Empire after the end of the First World War. An 18th century forebear, the second baronet, Sir Christopher Sykes (1749–1801), was a major figure in the enclosure movement that seized ownership of common land for private use.

Career

Vogue
In 1993, Sykes became a fashion assistant at British Vogue. She was featured that year, with, among others, designer Bella Freud and model Stella Tennant in Babes in London, in a photographic shoot by the American Steven Meisel (responsible in 1992 for the singer Madonna's controversial collection, Sex), which was produced by the rising fashion guru Isabella Blow (1958–2007).

In 1997, Sykes became a contributing editor on fashion for American Vogue, of which Anna Wintour, also British, had been editor-in-chief since 1988. (It was this period at Vogue that inspired Lauren Weisberger's 2003 novel The Devil Wears Prada.) Sykes soon became a familiar figure on the New York social scene, being frequently described as an "It girl".

A decade later, at 38, Sykes reflected that "when you hit 30 you lose your edge": invited by the Times to comment on the late-1990s trend for ultra-high heeled shoes, she observed that "these weird space-age shoes look cool and trendy and are a way of getting back to some degree", but that "this type of trend is not a classic version of beauty. Men want women to be sexy. They'd be happy if we were all [the model] Gisele Bündchen, but that's just not fashion".

Novelist
The world of New York fashion was the setting for Sykes' first novel, Bergdorf Blondes (2004), which was one of the most successful examples of "chick lit" (or "chic lit" as some dubbed Sykes' writing) and sold a quarter of a million copies worldwide. It took its title from the Bergdorf Goodman store in Upper Manhattan, founded at the end of the 19th century.

A second novel, The Debutante Divorcée, was published in 2006. Sykes publicised it with an array of personal appearances at stores in New York (Chanel, Ralph Lauren, Frederic Fekkai, Ferragamo, Neiman Marcus and Oscar de la Renta). The Debutante Divorcée appeared in paperback in 2007.

Some have seen Sykes' books as lying in natural succession to Sex and the City, Candace Bushnell's column in the New York Observer, which was the inspiration for a highly successful television series (HBO 1998–2004). Others remarked that the story was no less than the kind of offensive vapid claptrap you would expect from a dead-eyed rich girl. However, despite their satire, others have regarded them as too rooted in Sykes' own Park Avenue "set" to be reflective more generally of women's lives in post-9/11 Manhattan. Anita Loos' Gentlemen Prefer Blondes (1925) is perhaps a closer, if incomparable, antecedent.

Personal life
In 2005 Sykes married British entrepreneur Toby Rowland, son of businessman "Tiny" Rowland and co-creator of King, at Sledmere House, her family's ancestral home (1751) in the East Riding of Yorkshire. Her dress was designed by Sykes' friend and protégé of Isabella Blow, Alexander McQueen. Sykes was sometimes described as a muse of McQueen; she modelled for some of his earliest catwalk shows, as well as for photoshoots of his designs. Before her wedding, she wrote an article for Vogue about shopping for suitable lingerie for her wedding night, an article that included reference to a "$900 bra". Six years later some fashion journalists (anticipating correctly the chosen designer) claimed that Catherine Middleton had been inspired by Sykes' wedding dress to choose Burton to design hers for her marriage to Prince William.

Sykes and Rowland had their first child, Ursula, in October 2006 and their second child, Tess, in June 2010.

Sykes' twin sister Lucy, who moved to New York in 1996, became fashion director of Marie Claire, and later a designer of children's clothes. In the late 1990s the Sykes sisters were sometimes described as the "twin set". Sykes later joked, with reference to the heiresses Paris and Nicky Hilton, that "Lucy and I were Paris and Nicky without the sextape" (an allusion to the sex tape featuring Paris Hilton and a former boyfriend that had been posted on the internet in 2003). Lucy Sykes married Euan Rellie, a New York-based investment banker, in 2002.

Anxiety disorder
In the April 2012 issue of Vogue, Sykes writes of her three-year struggle with anxiety disorder and agoraphobia after the birth of her children, a condition which rendered her unable to work or to maintain her social life or passion for horse riding. Sykes admitted "I had visited doctors and consultants and had tests, procedures and scans, but no one could tell me what was wrong... I felt terrified, mentally and physically I was jelly. I was afraid to do anything. "Take some Xanax", said one doctor, 'it's anxiety". Sykes attended an anxiety recovery programme developed by anxiety expert, Charles Linden, which she cites as the solution that returned her to working for American Vogue and a full and active social life. In the article, Sykes says 'I started The Linden Method... and felt better almost immediately... I took the girls to the park and pushed them on the swings, something I hadn't been able to do for two years... now more than a year later, the anxiety has not returned."

Novels by Plum Sykes 
Bergdorf Blondes (2004)
The Debutante Divorcée (2006)
Party Girls Die in Pearls: An Oxford Girl Mystery (2017)

References

External links 
"The Debutante Divorcée" in the New York Times Sunday Book Review
Girl on the Avenue
Plum Sykes' unveiled advice
My big fat Yorkshire wedding
"Victoria's secret" – Hedley Freeman in the Guardian, 17 April 2004
"My best friends, the ultimate It girls" – Rowan Pelling in the Daily Telegraph, 21 April 2005
"Victoria's secrets" – Gaby Wood in the Observer, 14 May 2006
Anxiety Recovery Retreats  – Plum Sykes attended The Anxiety Recovery Retreat, 2011
Plum Sykes talks about her personal style

1969 births
20th-century English non-fiction writers
21st-century English writers
Sykes, Victoria (Plum)
British chick lit writers
English women novelists
English fashion journalists
Living people
New York (state) in fiction
People educated at Sevenoaks School
People from Sevenoaks
British Vogue
Vogue (magazine) people
British women journalists
20th-century English women writers
21st-century English women writers
English women non-fiction writers